Tess was a Spanish pop band. They first appeared in 2000 in the youth series Al salir de clase. Originally the group was formed by members Elsa Pinilla, Laura Pinto and Úrsula Sebastián.  However, in 2002 Úrsula left the band soon afterwards, originally saying that she wished to release her own album. Rosa López-Francos was announced as Úrsula's replacement, and the trio released two more studio albums. In 2005 they announced their official split, instead pursuing solo careers in music and cinema.

Discography

Albums
 (2000) A nuestra edad (Gold record)
 (2002) Quiero ser yo
 (2004) Amor libre

Singles
 (2000) "De carne y hueso"
 (2001) "Caramelos picantes"
 (2001) "Cuando te enamoras"
 (2002) "Quiero ser yo"
 (2002) "Todo es mentira"
 (2003) "En secreto"
 (2004) "Amor libre"
 (2004) "Maldita canción"

References

External links
Elsa Pinilla Official Website 
Rosa López-Francos Official Website

Spanish musical groups
Spanish girl groups
Musical groups established in 2000
Musical groups disestablished in 2005